121 Financial Ballpark (originally the Baseball Grounds of Jacksonville) is a baseball park in Jacksonville, Florida. It is the home stadium of the Jacksonville Jumbo Shrimp Minor League Baseball team, who play in the International League. The facility opened in 2003.

History
The Baseball Grounds were proposed as part of the city planning program known as the Better Jacksonville Plan. It was designed to replace the aging Wolfson Park, the previous home of the Double-A Southern League's Jacksonville Jumbo Shrimp. The facility cost $34 million and broke ground in 2002, with construction being completed the following year. It became the first completed project of the Better Jacksonville Plan.

The Atlantic Coast Conference baseball championship was held at the venue from 2005 to 2008. The Georgia Tech Yellow Jackets won the first ACC Tournament at the Baseball Grounds of Jacksonville, followed by the Clemson Tigers in 2006, the North Carolina Tar Heels in 2007, and the Miami Hurricanes in 2008.

The Baseball Grounds hosts an annual game between the Florida Gators and the Florida State Seminoles. The most recent game was on March 29, 2022, when Florida defeated Florida State 6–3 in front of 8,122 fans.

The ballpark has twice hosted the Southern League All-Star Game. On July 8, 2003, the league's West Division All-Stars defeated the East Division All-Stars, 7–5, before 7,552 spectators. On July 17, 2013, the South Division defeated the North Division, 6–0, in front of a crowd of 9,373.

The Jacksonville Jumbo Shrimp became the Triple-A affiliate of the Miami Marlins in 2021 and shifted from the Southern League to the Triple-A East.

Features

The facility has nearly 6,000 stadium-style chairs and can accommodate more than 11,000 fans, with an old-fashioned design, brick facade and a grass seating berm and bleacher seating. It also features 12 luxury skyboxes, four skydecks, a large scoreboard and videoboard, a playground, and the "knuckle," a unique  mound for seating at the left field corner. Other ballpark features include a souvenir shop, first aid facility, various seating levels and perspectives, an ample number of restrooms and concession areas, in-seat concession services behind home plate, wide concourse and seating aisles and a high-definition video scoreboard in left center field.

The park has an in-house video broadcast of games provided by The Schelldorf Television Network. The ballpark is located in downtown Jacksonville, situated between VyStar Veterans Memorial Arena and TIAA Bank Field.

Attendance records
The largest crowd for a baseball game at the ballpark was 12,943, which occurred on April 11, 2003 during the grand opening of the park in a game between the Jacksonville Suns and the Huntsville Stars.

References

External links

 Official website
 Baseball Grounds of Jacksonville Views – Ball Parks of the Minor Leagues

Minor league baseball venues
Sports venues in Jacksonville, Florida
Baseball venues in Florida
Rugby union stadiums in Florida
Baseball in Jacksonville, Florida
North American Soccer League stadiums
Soccer venues in Florida
Rugby league stadiums in the United States
Rugby league in Florida
Sports venues completed in 2003
Jacksonville Armada FC
Downtown Jacksonville
Sports Complex, Jacksonville
2003 establishments in Florida
Postmodern architecture in Florida
Populous (company) buildings
International League ballparks